Drolmakyi is a famous popular Tibetan singer. She was arrested on March 30, 2008 by the Chinese authorities, during the period of 2008 Tibetan unrest.
At the end of May, she was released after almost two months of detention on conditions of  silence on her arrest and of not more to do representations during some times.

See also 
Political prisoner

References 

Living people
21st-century Tibetan women singers
Year of birth missing (living people)